Shabnam Mobarez (born 27 August 1995) is an Afghan football player. , she is captain of the Afghanistan women's national football team.

Early life 
Born in Kabul, Afghanistan, to an ethnic Pashtun family, originally from Kapisa,  Mobarez emigrated to Denmark with her family in 2002–2003 due to the War in Afghanistan (2001–present). She began playing football with boys in the street without her parents knowing and was later invited to join a professional club, which she did with her parents' support. She played for the Danish City Club.

Playing career

Club

Aalborg 
Mobarez plays for Danish club, Aalborg BK.

International 
Mobarez declined an offer to play for the Denmark women's national football team and instead chose to represent Afghanistan. Of the choice, she said, "We are trying to bring something positive to the country. These women are so brave they inspire me to do better and, because I live in a safe country, to work harder for them." She started playing for Afghanistan in 2014 and has captained the team since 2016. After starting with the national team as a striker, Mobarez switched to the midfielder position.

In March 2018, Mobarez was part of a group of players from 20 different countries who played in a match in the Dead Sea region of Jordan and set a new world record for the lowest altitude match ever played.

After the 2021 Taliban offensive, Mobarez was one of a number of Afghan women's footballers who were evacuated from Afghanistan to Australia.

Other work 
Mobarez coaches women's teams at a refugee camp in Denmark.

References

External links 
 Profile at Pakistan Football Federation

Living people
1995 births
Sportspeople from Kabul
Afghan women's footballers
Afghanistan women's international footballers
Afghan emigrants to Denmark
Women's association football midfielders